Geresh (׳ in Hebrew: ‎ or ‎<ref>Even-Shoshan Dictionary, 2003; Shoshana Bahat and Mordechay Mishor, Dictionary of Contemporary Hebrew, 2007.</ref> , or medieval ) is a sign in Hebrew writing.  It has two meanings.

An apostrophe-like sign (also known colloquially as a chupchik) placed after a letter:
 as a diacritic that modifies the pronunciation of some letters (only in modern Hebrew),
 as a diacritic that signifies Yiddish origin of a word or suffix, (examples below)
 as a punctuation mark to denote initialisms or abbreviations,
 or to denote a single-digit Hebrew numeral
 A note of cantillation in the reading of the Torah and other Biblical books, taking the form of a curved diagonal stroke placed above a letter.

Diacritic

As a diacritic, the Geresh is written immediately after (left of) the letter it modifies. It may be compared to the usage of a following h'' in various Latin digraphs to form other consonant sounds not supported by the basic Latin alphabet, such as "sh", "th", etc.

Loanwords, slang, foreign names and transliterations

Transcriptions of Arabic

There are six additional letters in the Arabic alphabet. They are Ṯāʾ, Ḫāʾ, Ḏāl, Ḍād, Ẓāʾ, and Ghayn. Also, some letters have different sounds in Arabic phonology and modern Hebrew phonology, such as Jīm.

Transliteration of foreign names

Note
*  Both double-vav and vav with geresh are non-standard and so inconsistently used.

Yiddish origin

Some words or suffixes with Yiddish origin or pronunciation are marked with a geresh, e.g. the diminutive suffix  – , e.g.  –  (as in Yankale Bodo), or the words  – , 'guys' (which is the Yiddish pronunciation of Hebrew   'company'), or  – , 'bottom-line'.

Punctuation mark
The geresh is used as a punctuation mark in initialisms and to denote numerals.

Indicating initialisms
In initialisms, the Geresh is written after the last letter of the initialism. For example: the title גְּבֶרֶת (literally "lady") is abbreviated גב׳, equivalent to English "Mrs" and "Ms".

Denoting a numeral
A Geresh can be appended after (left of) a single letter to indicate that the letter represents a Hebrew numeral. For example: ק׳‎ represents 100. A multi-digit Hebrew numeral is indicated by the Gershayim .

Cantillation mark

As a note of cantillation in the reading of the Torah, the Geresh is printed above the accented letter: ב֜. The  (lit. 'a Geresh made earlier'), a variant cantillation mark, is also printed above the accented letter, but slightly before (i.e. more to the right of) the position of the normal Geresh: ב֝. As a cantillation mark it is also called ‎.

Computer encoding

Most keyboards do not have a key for the geresh. As a result, an apostrophe ( ', Unicode U+0027) is often substituted for it.

See also
 Gershayim
 Hebraization of English
 Hebrew alphabet
 Hebrew numerals

References

Hebrew diacritics
Punctuation